Michihiro Ogasawara (小笠原 道大, born October 25, 1973 in Mihama-ku, Chiba, Chiba Prefecture, Japan) is a Japanese former professional baseball player. He is currently the first team head coach for Hokkaido Nippon-Ham Fighters.

He had an illustrious career spanning 18 years with the Hokkaido Nippon-Ham Fighters, Yomiuri Giants, and the Chunichi Dragons where he won two Japan Series, two MVP awards in both the Pacific and Central leagues; only one of two people to do so and the first to do it in consecutive seasons. He was an NPB All-Star 11 times. He was also a part of the 2006 and 2009 World Baseball Classic winning Japan sides.

Early career
Ogasawara started playing baseball at age 7 playing in the Chiba West Little League. From 1989 he studied at Gyosei International High School in Kisarazu, Chiba Prefecture. When he started at the team he was regarded as a complete no-name and his then coach mentioned that "we were asked to go after a junior middle schooler from the Chiba West Little League and we got the player that no one spoke of, Ogasawara." Up until that point he had been tried at a variety of fielding positions including shortstop, third base and outfield but during high school was converted to be a second baseman and the following year served as a catcher (however Ogasawara admits that catcher was his least favourite position) In his junior year, alongside fellow future pro Tetsuya Kitagawa he finished runner-up in the Chiba prefectural tournament. Although now widely regarded for his power and hitting prowess, Ogaswara failed to register a single home run in the tournament.

Following graduation from high school, Ogasawara was employed with NTT East. He was judged at the time to, even in the worst case, still be of use as a bullpen catcher. He would start life with the team as a catcher and later form a battery with future Hokkaido Nippon Ham Fighters team-mate, Naoyuki Tateishi. In 1996, he took part in the 67th Intercity baseball tournament, playing alongside Nobuhiko Matsunaka with Nippon Steel & Sumitomo Metal Kazusa Magic  to reach the best 8.

In 1996, Ogasawara was the third draft pick selected by the Fighters in the 1996 Nippon Professional Baseball Draft where he made the declaration that he would become a "player that can contest for batting titles."

Professional career

Ogasawara was one of the most consistent hitters in Japanese baseball. He led the league in hits from –, and has won 6 Japanese Golden Glove awards at first base and third base. He participated in the 2004 Summer Olympics held in Athens, Greece, winning a bronze medal. He also played for the Japanese national team in the 2006 World Baseball Classic, where he hit a home run off Esteban Loaiza at Angel Stadium of Anaheim. In 2006, he helped the Hokkaido Nippon-Ham Fighters win their first Pacific League pennant since , sweeping the Fukuoka SoftBank Hawks in the playoffs to reach the Japanese championship series against the Chunichi Dragons. The Fighters beat the Dragons in 5 games to win the Japanese championship series.

He became a free agent in 2006, and signed a four-year contract with the Yomiuri Giants during the off-season.

Following 6 successful years with the Giants, Ogasawara would move to the Chunichi Dragons in 2013 and retired with the team at the conclusion of the 2015 season.

Post-retirement and coaching career
Following retirement, Ogasawara was instated as the head coach of the Chunichi Dragons' minor league team, playing in the Western League. Following the dismissal of first team manager, Motonobu Tanishige on the 8th of August, 2016 Ogasawara was mentioned as the main candidate to replace the outgoing manager at the season's end. He was however unsuccessful in attaining the manager position as senior figures at the Dragons decided to appoint a more experienced manager in Shigekazu Mori to help rebuild the team.

On 29 September 2019, it was announced that Ogasawara would not be renewing his contract with the Dragons for the 2020 season with speculation linking him with the vacant Nippon Ham Fighters managerial position.

References

External links

NPB

1973 births
People from Kisarazu
2006 World Baseball Classic players
2009 World Baseball Classic players
Baseball players at the 2004 Summer Olympics
Baseball people from Chiba Prefecture
Chunichi Dragons players
Hokkaido Nippon-Ham Fighters players
Living people
Medalists at the 2004 Summer Olympics
Nippon Ham Fighters players
Nippon Professional Baseball coaches
Nippon Professional Baseball catchers
Nippon Professional Baseball first basemen
Nippon Professional Baseball third basemen
Nippon Professional Baseball MVP Award winners
Olympic baseball players of Japan
Olympic bronze medalists for Japan
Olympic medalists in baseball
People from Chiba (city)
Yomiuri Giants players